The Czech Center Museum Houston (DBA), also known as Czech Cultural & Community Center, is a  multifunctional cultural organization located in the Museum District of Houston, Texas, committed to the education and celebration of Czech (Moravian, Bohemian, Silesian) and Slovakian culture, art, and history.

History

The organization was founded in 1995 as Czech Cultural & Community Center by Bill Rosene, Effie Rosene, and many other people's passionate hard work. Bill Rosene and Effie Rosene were handling the daily operations until 2017 and were involved until Effie Rosene's death in 2019.

Originally located in The Northwest Mall, the organization began construction of their new and current building at 4920 San Jacinto Street in 2002. The name was changed to Czech Center Museum Houston shortly after becoming part of the Houston Museum District. In 2005, the organization began construction of a third floor which was completed in 2009. The addition of the third floor allowed the museum to expand its collection and include the largest Czechoslovakian Art Deco Collection in the USA donated by Eric Ottervik.

Architecture

Czech Center Museum Houston's current building was built specifically for the museum inspired by 19th century Czech Villa designs, including baroque-style ornaments, stained glass, and authentic Bohemian crystal chandeliers. The museum consists of three floors, the first two floors, Prague Hall and Brno Gallery which were named after the two most populated cities in the Czech Republic. These halls are used for cultural events featuring local and international artists and musicians. The third floor consists of Pilsen Hall, the museum's main exhibit area, and Comenius Library.

Art collection
Czech Center Museum Houston's current collection contains more than 5,000 pieces that demonstrate Czech and Slovak culture, art, and history of the last two centuries. The collection includes

Bohemian, Moravian, Silesian, and Slovakian Folk art from the 18th century to 1980. The collection includes jewelry, kroje, textiles, sculptures, and antique ornaments. 
Czech and Slovak paintings and posters depicting the history of eastern European people. 
Bohemian Glass, crystal perfume bottles, and crystal chandeliers from the late 19th century to the modern era.
An expansive library of books from Austria-Hungary to the modern era. 
Vintage Czech dolls and antique pottery and porcelain.

Moon Landscape replica by Petr Ginz

In 2018, astronaut Andrew Feustel brought a copy of Petr Ginz's Moon Landscape drawing to the International Space Station. On February 1, 2020, Feustel donated the copy to Czech Center Museum Houston, which is now on display on the third floor. The donation was made in memory of Holocaust victims and the crew of Space Shuttle Columbia. Inspired by Ginz's story, Ilan Ramonwhose grandfather and other family members were murdered in the Holocausttook Moon Landscape with him on Space Shuttle Columbia. Tragically the shuttle, crew, and drawing were destroyed upon re-entry to earth's atmosphere.

References

External links

Houston Museum District

1995 establishments in Texas
Museums in Houston
Museums of Czech culture abroad
Ethnic museums in Texas
Czech-American culture in Texas
Czech-American history